Frontera Sur may refer to:

Frontera Sur (1943 film), an Argentine film directed by Belisario García Villar
Frontera Sur (1993 film), a Mexican film directed by Ernesto García Cabral and Hugo Stiglitz
Frontera Sur (1998 film), an Argentine film directed by Gerardo Herrero